Old Conemaugh Borough Historic District is a national historic district located at Johnstown in Cambria County, Pennsylvania. The district includes 330 contributing buildings in a predominantly working-class residential area in Johnstown. It includes a few examples of high-style Victorian-era dwellings representing the Queen Anne and Second Empire styles. Notable buildings include the Young House (c. 1850), Christian Kakuck House (1888). Spenger House (c. 1890), W. H. Smith Residence (c. 1870), Otto M. Hornick House (1904), American House (1832), Brass Rail Bar (c. 1890), St. Joseph's German Catholic Church (1868), Central Catholic School (1906), and Hudson Street School (1895, 1924).

It was listed on the National Register of Historic Places in 1995.

References 

Historic districts on the National Register of Historic Places in Pennsylvania
Second Empire architecture in Pennsylvania
Queen Anne architecture in Pennsylvania
Historic districts in Cambria County, Pennsylvania
National Register of Historic Places in Cambria County, Pennsylvania